Edgar Valentine Yeomans (14 February 1886 – 29 January 1971) was an Australian rules footballer who played with Carlton in the Victorian Football League (VFL).

Notes

External links 

Edgar Yeomans's profile at Blueseum

1886 births
1971 deaths
Australian rules footballers from Melbourne
Carlton Football Club players
People from Northcote, Victoria